GSAT-15 is an Indian communication satellite similar to GSAT-10 to augment the capacity of transponders to provide more bandwidth for Direct-to-Home television and VSAT services. It was successfully launched on 10 November 2015 at 21:34:07 UTC aboard an Ariane 5 rocket, along with the ArabSat 6B satellite.

Payload
The satellite carries 24 Ku band transponders and a GAGAN navigational payload operating in the L1 and L5 bands. Besides that it will also carry 2 Ku band beacons.

Satellite
GSAT-15 has an estimated lifespan of 12 years. It will augment telecommunication, Direct-to-Home and radio navigation services.

Cost

See also

 Indian Regional Navigation Satellite System
 Global Navigation Satellite System
 Global Positioning System

References

GSAT satellites
Spacecraft launched in 2015
2015 in India
Ariane commercial payloads